In the Kingdom of the Netherlands, the monarchy is a constitutional office and is controlled by the Constitution of the Netherlands. A distinction is made between members of the royal family and members of the royal house.

Membership 
According to the Membership to the Royal House Act which was revised in 2002, the members of the royal house are:

 the monarch (king or queen) as head of the royal house;
 the members of the royal family in the line of succession to the Dutch throne but limited to two degrees of kinship from the current monarch (first degree are parents and second degree are siblings);
 the heir to the throne;
 the former monarch (on abdication);
 the members of the royal house of further degrees of kinship if they were already members of the royal house prior to the revision of the act in 2002, were adults at the time and remain in the direct line of succession;
 the spouses of the above;
 the widows and widowers of the above, provided that they do not remarry, and that their spouses would still qualify if they were still alive today.

Current members 

 The King (King Willem-Alexander of the Netherlands), the current head of the royal house, oldest child of Queen Beatrix
 The Queen (Queen Máxima), wife of the King
The Princess of Orange (Catharina-Amalia), eldest child of the King and Queen
 Princess Alexia, middle child of the King and Queen
 Princess Ariane, youngest child of the King and Queen

 Prince Constantijn, third and youngest child of Queen Beatrix and Prince Claus
 Princess Laurentien, wife of Prince Constantijn

Loss of membership 

The membership is lost if the right to succeed to the Dutch throne is lost, e.g. by marrying without parliament’s approval. This applied to several members of the royal family:

 in 1964 Princess Irene married Carlos Hugo, Duke of Parma
 in 1975 Princess Christina married Jorge Guillermo
 in 2004 Prince Friso married Mabel Wisse Smit; the government declined to ask official parliamentary permission for the marriage
 in 2005 Prince Pieter-Christiaan married Anita van Eijk
 in 2005 Prince Floris married Aimée Söhngen

In addition the membership is lost when a person, who was formerly a member, loses his direct right to succession because he or she is no longer related to the current monarch within three degrees of kinship. When King Willem-Alexander assumed the throne in 2013 this applied to:

 Prince Maurits and his wife Princess Marilène
 Prince Bernhard and his wife Princess Annette

Membership is also lost to persons who are still in the direct line of succession, but are no longer related to the current monarch within two degrees of kinship. When King Willem-Alexander assumed the throne in 2013 this applied to:

 Countess Eloise of Orange-Nassau van Amsberg
 Count Claus-Casimir of Orange-Nassau van Amsberg
 Countess Leonore of Orange-Nassau van Amsberg

All children of Prince Constantijn and Princess Laurentien

References

Royal House
Royal and noble courts